Celestine (the IMA-accepted name) or celestite is a mineral consisting of strontium sulfate (SrSO). The mineral is named for its occasional delicate blue color. Celestine and the carbonate mineral strontianite are the principal sources of the element strontium, commonly used in fireworks and in various metal alloys.

Etymology
Celestine derives its name from the Latin word caelestis meaning celestial which in turn is derived from the Latin word caelum meaning sky or heaven.

Occurrence
Celestine occurs as crystals, and also in compact massive, and fibrous forms. It is mostly found in sedimentary rocks, often associated with the minerals gypsum, anhydrite, and halite. On occasion in some localities, it may also be found with sulfur inclusions.

The mineral is found worldwide, usually in small quantities. Pale blue crystal specimens are found in Madagascar. White and orange variants also occurred at Yate, Bristol, UK, where it was extracted for commercial purposes until April 1991.

The skeletons of the protozoan Acantharea are made of celestine, unlike those of other radiolarians which are made of silica.

In carbonate marine sediments, burial dissolution is a recognized mechanism of celestine precipitation. It is sometimes used as a gemstone.

Geodes
Celestine crystals are found in some geodes. The world's largest known geode, a celestine geode  in diameter at its widest point, is located near the village of Put-in-Bay, Ohio, on South Bass Island in Lake Erie. The geode has been converted into a viewing cave, Crystal Cave, with the crystals which once composed the floor of the geode removed.

Celestine geodes are understood to form by replacement of alabaster nodules consisting of the calcium sulfates gypsum or anhydrite. Calcium sulfate is sparingly soluble, but strontium sulfate is mostly insoluble. Strontium-bearing solutions that come into contact with calcium sulfate nodules dissolve the calcium away, leaving a cavity. The strontium is immediately precipitated as celestine, with the crystals growing into the newly-formed cavity.

Footnotes

See also
 List of minerals

References

External links

Strontium minerals
Sulfate minerals
Orthorhombic minerals
Minerals in space group 62
Luminescent minerals
Evaporite
Gemstones
Baryte group